The Fingal Memorial Shield is a trophy in the sport of shinty. It is currently the trophy presented to the winners of the St Andrew's Sixes, an international six-a-side tournament.

History
The shield was presented in memory of Hugh MacCorquodale, (1866-1937) who wrote for the Oban Times, under the pen name, Fingal.  The trophy was presented by the Gaelic Society of Glasgow in order to encourage shinty in the South.

The Fingal tournament was originally played in Glasgow at Glasgow University's then home of Garscadden.

In the 1970s, the tournament was held at Glasgow and latterly at St. Andrew's, St. Andrew's University Shinty Club who were set up in 1967. The success of the tournament was such that when St Andrews University Shinty Club won the 1975 Shinty Yearbook Trophy its hosting of the very successful six-a-side competition was specifically mentioned. However, by the late 1980s, the tournament had fallen into abeyance and the trophy itself went missing.

The St Andrew's Sixes was re-established in 1999 and has been played most years since with both men and women taking part. The shield was recovered for this event and was presented for the next few years until its long stay in Killmallie from 2004 to 2013.  It was again recovered for 2013 and was presented to Aberdour Shinty Club.  All previous winners were added to the trophy.

Aberdour were the 2017 winners. 2018 saw the first Women's St Andrews Sixes event alongside the men's  with The English Shinty Association winning the Women's Trophy and West Coast Nomads winning the Fingal Shield. 2019 saw Cornwall Shinty Club meet London Camanchd in a hotly contested final, which London went on to win 2–1.

Winners
 
2019 London Camanachd
2018 West Coast Nomads
2017 Aberdour
2016 Aberdour
2015 Aberdour
2014 Inverness-shire Camanachd
2013 Aberdour
2012 Glasgow Island
2011 St Andrews University Exiles
2007 St Andrews University Shinty Club
2004 Kilmallie Shinty Club
2003 Glenorchy Shinty Club
2002 Glasgow Mid Argyll
2001 Glenorchy Shinty Club
2000 Edinburgh East Lothian
1999 Musselburgh Shinty Club
1987 Aberdeen University
1986 Glasgow Highland
1985 Aberdeen University
1984 Inverness Shinty Club
1982 Inverness Shinty Club
1981 Inverness Shinty Club
1980 Lochaber Camanchd
1979 Glenorchy Shinty Club
1978 Bute
1977 Fort William
1976 Lochaber Camanachd
1975 Lochaber Camanachd
1974 Glasgow Mid Argyle
1973 Edinburgh University Shinty Club
1972 Glasgow Inverness Shinty Club
1969 Glasgow Mid-Argyll, defeating Kelvin
1965 Glasgow Police Shinty Club
1964 Glasgow Mid-Argyll
1963 Glasgow Mid-Argyll
1962 Kyles Athletic Shinty Club
1961 Bute Shinty Club
1960 Bute Shinty Club
1959 Glasgow Mid-Argyll
1957 Glasgow Mid-Argyll
1953  Glasgow Skye
1952 Edinburgh Camanachd 
1951 Glasgow University Shinty Club
1950 Glasgow Skye Shinty Club
1949 Glasgow University Shinty Club

References

External links
St Andrews Sixes 2014

Shinty
Shinty competitions
Recurring sporting events established in 1969
Sports trophies and awards